The 1985 NAIA World Series was the 29th annual tournament hosted by the National Association of Intercollegiate Athletics to determine the national champion of baseball among its member colleges and universities in the United States and Canada.

The tournament was played at Harris Field in Lewiston, Idaho.

Hometown team and defending champions Lewis–Clark State (51–20) defeated Dallas Baptist (56–24) in a single-game championship series, 10–6, to win the Warriors' second NAIA World Series.

Lewis–Clark State pitcher Tony Dineen was named tournament MVP.

Bracket

Preliminary bracket

Championship bracket

See also
 1985 NCAA Division I baseball tournament
 1985 NCAA Division II baseball tournament
 1985 NCAA Division III baseball tournament
 1985 NAIA Softball World Series

Reference

|NAIA World Series
NAIA World Series
NAIA World Series
NAIA World Series